The year 1966 was marked by many events that left an imprint on the history of Soviet and Russian Fine Arts.

Events
 Guaranteed wage for artists for the first time introduced in Leningrad. Its size was 150-200 rubles a month, roughly in line with the average wage in the industry. This innovation was seized about 500 visual artists of all disciplines.
 Exhibition of young leningrad artists opened in the Leningrad Union of Artists.
 Autumn Exhibition of leningrad artists of 1966 year opened in the Leningrad Union of Artists.

Deaths
 March 7 — Samuil Adlivankin, Russian soviet graphic artists (born 1897).
 March 29 — Vladimir Ingal, soviet sculptor, Honored art worker of Russian Federation, Stalin Prize winner (born 1901).
 August 16 — Gavriil Gorelov, Russian soviet painter Горелов Гавриил Никитич (Никитьевич), русский советский живописец, Honored art worker of Russian Federation, Stalin Prize winner (born 1880).
 December 20 — Matvey Manizer, soviet sculptor, People's Artist of the USSR, Stalin Prize winner (born 1891).

See also
 List of Russian artists
 List of painters of Leningrad Union of Artists
 Saint Petersburg Union of Artists
 Russian culture

References

Sources
 Дмитренко А., Фёдорова Н. А где же молодость? О «Выставке молодых» // Смена, 1966, 11 ноября.
 Artists of Peoples of the USSR. Biography Dictionary. Vol. 1. Moscow, Iskusstvo, 1970.
 Artists of Peoples of the USSR. Biography Dictionary. Vol. 2. Moscow, Iskusstvo, 1972.
 Directory of Members of Union of Artists of USSR. Volume 1,2. Moscow, Soviet Artist Edition, 1979.
 Directory of Members of the Leningrad branch of the Union of Artists of Russian Federation. Leningrad, Khudozhnik RSFSR, 1980.
 Artists of Peoples of the USSR. Biography Dictionary. Vol. 4 Book 1. Moscow, Iskusstvo, 1983.
 Directory of Members of the Leningrad branch of the Union of Artists of Russian Federation. - Leningrad: Khudozhnik RSFSR, 1987.
 Artists of peoples of the USSR. Biography Dictionary. Vol. 4 Book 2. - Saint Petersburg: Academic project humanitarian agency, 1995.
 Link of Times: 1932 - 1997. Artists - Members of Saint Petersburg Union of Artists of Russia. Exhibition catalogue. - Saint Petersburg: Manezh Central Exhibition Hall, 1997.
 Matthew C. Bown. Dictionary of 20th Century Russian and Soviet Painters 1900-1980s. London, Izomar, 1998.
 Vern G. Swanson. Soviet Impressionism. Woodbridge, England, Antique Collectors' Club, 2001.
 Время перемен. Искусство 1960—1985 в Советском Союзе. СПб., Государственный Русский музей, 2006.
 Sergei V. Ivanov. Unknown Socialist Realism. The Leningrad School. Saint-Petersburg, NP-Print Edition, 2007. , .
 Anniversary Directory graduates of Saint Petersburg State Academic Institute of Painting, Sculpture, and Architecture named after Ilya Repin, Russian Academy of Arts. 1915 - 2005. Saint Petersburg: Pervotsvet Publishing House, 2007.

Art
Soviet Union